Jezernice is a municipality and village in Přerov District in the Olomouc Region of the Czech Republic. It has about 700 inhabitants.

Geography
It lies in the Moravian Gate lowland. The Bečva River flows through the southern part of the municipality.

History
The first written mention of Jezernice is from 1353. Among the most notable owners of the village were the Pernštejn family and Cardinal Franz von Dietrichstein.

Transport
The D1 motorway runs north of Jezernice.

Sights
Jezernice is known for a pair of adjacent railway viaducts, protected as a cultural monument. The southern brick viaduct was built for Emperor Ferdinand Northern Railway in 1842 and the northern stone viaduct was added in 1873 to make the track double-track.

The Church of Saint Martin dates from the 15th century.

Gallery

References

External links

Villages in Přerov District